This is a list of the complete squads for the 2009 Six Nations Championship, an annual rugby union tournament contested by the national rugby teams of England, France, Ireland, Italy, Scotland, and Wales. Each country was entitled to name a squad of 39 players to contest the championship. They could also invite additional players along prior to the start of the championship while the coach could call up replacement players if squad members suffered serious injury.

All caps are as of the start of the tournament, and do not include appearances made during the competition.

England
England announced their 32-man squad for the 2009 Six Nations on 14 January 2009, including both Tom Palmer, who missed the entire tournament with a shoulder injury, and Tom Rees, who was ruled out of the first three games with knee trouble. Prop Matt Stevens was replaced in the squad by Julian White after Stevens was found to have taken a banned substance. Flanker Lewis Moody broke his ankle while training with his club, Leicester Tigers, and was replaced in the England squad by Steffon Armitage, brother of fullback Delon Armitage. Andy Goode, Joe Worsley and Paul Hodgson were all called up to train with the squad and went on to take part in the tournament, while Louis Deacon and Olly Barkley replaced the injured Tom Palmer and Shane Geraghty.

Head coach: Martin Johnson

France
France named their final 23-man squad for the Six Nations on 28 January. Eight players from their training squad lost their places in the final 23, with only Biarritz number 8 Imanol Harinordoquy being brought in from outside the original 30.

As cover for prop Lionel Faure, who was nursing an injured calf, Clermont Auvergne's Thomas Domingo was called up to the squad on 11 February. Maxime Mermoz was called up in place of the banned Florian Fritz. Renaud Boyoud was also drafted in place of the injured Benoît Lecouls. Mathieu Bastareaud was called up for the injured Lionel Beauxis with Benoît Baby moving to fly-half, while Sylvain Marconnet was brought into the squad after injuries to both Benoît Lecouls and Nicolas Mas. François Trinh-Duc was also called up as specialist fly-half cover. On 4 March Jérôme Thion, Julien Bonnaire and Damien Traille were all added to the squad, while Sébastien Chabal shifted from lock to the back row. For their final game against Italy, France called up William Servat and Frédéric Michalak to replace Benjamin Kayser who had a neck injury and Sébastien Tillous-Borde who withdrew with a biceps problem.

Head coach: Marc Lièvremont

Ireland
Ireland named their squad for the 2009 Six Nations on 21 January 2009. Included in the 39-man squad were seven uncapped players, as well as inside centre Gordon D'Arcy, who had only returned in December from a broken arm picked up in the opening game of the 2008 Six Nations.

Head coach: Declan Kidney

Italy
Italy's squad for the Six Nations, named on 29 January 2009 by Nick Mallett:

Italy lost both of their specialist scrum-halves, Simon Picone and Pietro Travagli, for the entire Six Nations due to injury. Pablo Canavosio was called up but failed to recover from a knee injury in time for Italy's opener. This led head coach Nick Mallett to make a move he had been contemplating even before Canavosio's withdrawal – shifting Mauro Bergamasco from flanker to scrum-half.

After Bergamasco's poor performance at scrum-half in the opener against England, in which his mistakes directly led to three of England's five tries, Mallett recalled Paul Griffen to play scrum-half and moved Bergamasco back to his normal flanker position. Carlo Del Fava was also brought in as an experienced second row forward. Leonardo Ghiraldini was called up after he recovered from injury but Fabio Ongaro was ruled out, so Franco Sbaraglini was also called up. On 3 March, Mallett added several players to the squad. Coming in were Fabio Staibano, Simone Favaro, Kris Burton and Michele Sepe. After returning from his suspension Andrea Masi picked up a back injury, Luciano Orquera was brought into the squad as cover.

Head coach: Nick Mallett

Scotland
Scotland named a 33-man squad for the 2009 Six Nations on 20 January 2009, and included uncapped prop Geoff Cross and fly-half Ruaridh Jackson. However, after injuries and illness hit the squad, a further five players were added to train on 30 January. After injuries to Geoff Cross and the Allan Jacobsen, Moray Low was called into the main squad to provide cover for the final two games. Following a return to fitness Rory Lamont was called up to the squad, but the game against Ireland came to soon for him.

Head coach: Frank Hadden

Wales
Wales announced their squad for the 2009 Six Nations on 19 January 2009, naming a group of 28 players. Following a knee injury to scrum-half Gareth Cooper in training, head coach Warren Gatland opted to call 64-cap Sale Sharks scrum-half Dwayne Peel into the squad. After Dwayne Peel had also been ruled out with injury, Gatland was forced to call up London Irish scrum-half Warren Fury for bench cover.

Head coach: Warren Gatland

References

External links
 RBS Six Nations Squad Index

2009
2009 Six Nations Championship